, also known as Ghost Cat of Arima (Kaiden arima neko) or Ghost Cat of Arima Palace, is a 1937 Japanese horror film directed by Shigeru Kito. The film was remade in 1953 by Daiei Film.

See also 
 Japanese horror
 Ghost-Cat of Gojusan-Tsugi - a 1956 film directed by Bin Kado
 Ghost-Cat Wall of Hatred - a 1958 film directed by Kenji Misumi

References

External links 
 

Japanese horror films
Japanese black-and-white films
1937 films
1937 fantasy films
1937 horror films